The Paradise Bangkok Molam International Band is a hybridized roots music band from Thailand. Their musical style is a mixture of traditional Thai music, particularly molam music. There are also elements of blues, folk rock and dub. They have appeared at various international concerts.

Background
The formation of the band came about as a result of a DJ project in a bid to bring back to life Thai sounds deemed lost.
While an unknown act in their country, they released their debut album 21st Century Molam. Their second album was Planet Lam. The album was released on 21 October 2016. It has been said that the inspiration for the album came from a club owned by label co-owner Maft Sai. It had the same name.

Live performances
They have appeared in Bucharest in an event organized by online music magazine, The Attic. The other various festivals they have appeared at include the Off Festival in Poland and Festival Mundial in the Netherlands, as well as the Glastonbury and Field Day festivals in the UK.

Discography

Various artist compilations
 Top Of The World - Songlines CD 106 - 2015 - Featured song: "Show Wong Molam International"

References

Thai musical groups
Mor lam musicians
Musical groups from Bangkok
Musical groups established in 2012
2012 establishments in Thailand